Pierre Patry (November 2, 1933 – June 7, 2014) was a Canadian film director and screenwriter.

Biography
Born in Hull, Quebec, Patry began his career in the theatre as an actor and a playwright. He was a founding member of the Canadian Association of Amateur Theatre. He joined the National Film Board of Canada in 1957 as a writer on the Panoramique series. Patry was a major force in the beginning of the Quebec feature-film industry in the sixties. He directed three features, most notably Trouble-Maker (Trouble fête) in 1964.

He left the NFB in 1963 to co-found the film cooperative Coopératio with Roger Blais and Jean-Claude Lord. Unfortunately, the company shut down after five years because of systemic problems in the financing and distribution of feature films.

In 1981 he was a major player in the development of the French language educational television station Canal Savoir.

Patri died on June 7, 2014.

Filmography

As director

Fiction
Louis-Hippolyte Lafontaine - 1962, short
Françoise (Il y eut un soir... il y eut un matin) - 1964, short (re-released as part of the 1964 anthology film Trois Femmes)
Trouble-Maker (Trouble fête) - 1964
Caïn (Les Marcheurs de la nuit) - 1965
Rope Around the Neck (La corde au cou) - 1965

Documentaries
Eye Witness No. 99 (Documentary series Co-Directed with Hector Lemieux and Jacques Bobet, 1958) (Segment La roulotte)
Germaine Guèvremont romancière (Short film, 1959)
Les petites soeurs (Short film, 1959)
Le chanoine Lionel Groulx, historien (Short film, 1960)
Collèges contemporain (Short film, 1961)
Croisements et profits (Short film Co-Directed with Clément Perron, 1961)
Loisirs (Short film Co-Directed with Clément Perron, 1962)
Petit discours de la méthode (Short film Co-Directed with Claude Jutra, 1963)
Ghosts of a River (Trois hommes au mille carré) 1966 (Short film Co-Directed with Jacques Kasma, 1966)
Shapp for Governor (Short film Co-Directed with Morten Parker, 1966)
Infirmière de nuit (Short film, 1966)

As writer
The Little Sisters (Les petites soeurs) - 1959
Germaine Guèvremont, romancière - 1959
Collège contemporain - 1960
Le grand duc - 1959–1963
Le chanoine Lionel Groulx, historien - 1960
Louis-Hippolyte Lafontaine - 1962
Ti-Jean caribou - 1963–1966
Trouble-Maker (Trouble fête) - 1964
Rope Around the Neck (La corde au cou) - 1965

As producer
Françoise (Il y eut un soir... il y eut un matin) - 1964
Trouble-Maker (Trouble fête) - 1964
Rope Around the Neck (La corde au cou) - 1964
Caïn (Les Marcheurs du matin) - 1965
Deliver Us from Evil (Délivrez-nous du mal) (1966)
Dust from Underground (Poussière sur la ville) - 1968
Between Salt and Sweet Water (Entre la mer et l'eau douce) - 1968
A Great Big Thing - 1968
The Doves (Les Colombes) - 1972

References

External links

1933 births
2014 deaths
Film producers from Quebec
Canadian screenwriters in French
French Quebecers
Film directors from Quebec
Writers from Gatineau
National Film Board of Canada people
20th-century Canadian screenwriters
20th-century Canadian male writers